The A66 is a major road in Northern England, which in part follows the course of the Roman road from Scotch Corner to Penrith. It runs from east of Middlesbrough in North Yorkshire to Workington in Cumbria.

Route 

From its eastern terminus between Redcar and Middlesbrough it runs past Stockton-on-Tees and Darlington mainly as two-lane dual-carriageway and single carriageway past Darlington, becoming motorway standard as the A66(M) shortly before meeting junction 57 of the A1(M). It shares the A1(M) route south to Scotch Corner, from where it continues west across the Pennines, past Brough, Appleby, Kirkby Thore, Temple Sowerby and Penrith until it reaches Junction 40 of the M6 motorway at Skirsgill Interchange, where traffic going towards Western Scotland turns onto the northbound M6. The A66 continues past Blencathra to Keswick and Cockermouth and on through the northern reaches of the Lake District before arriving at the coastal town of Workington. There is a short stretch of dual carriageway along the northern part of Bassenthwaite Lake between Keswick and Cockermouth. Whilst the eastbound section follows the straight line of the disused Cockermouth, Keswick and Penrith Railway, the westbound section has numerous bends with climbs and dips. The westbound section was closed due to flood damage in December 2015 and when it re-opened in May 2016 had been permanently reduced to a single lane. This section has a  limit monitored by average speed cameras.

History 

When road numbers were first designated in the 1920s, the A66 was assigned to the route between Penrith and Hull via Scotch Corner and York, mainly along former Roman roads. Today's route largely follows the original route between Penrith and Scotch Corner. The historic route between Scotch Corner and Hull follows what is now today's A1, A168, B6265, A59 and A1079.

It is anomalously numbered since west of Penrith it trespasses into numbering zone 5; this is because it originally terminated at the A6 in Penrith but was extended further west in order to create one continuous east–west route. Most of what is now the A66 west of Penrith was originally A594 – only a small stub of this road numbering remains, from Maryport to Cockermouth.

Proposed developments

Trans-Pennine dualling 

The middle  section of the A66 between Scotch Corner on the A1(M) and Penrith on the M6 forms one of the key trans-Pennines trunk routes and has one of the worst road-safety records in the UK. Various bypasses and upgrades have been constructed since the early 1970s, giving the current mix of single and dual-carriageway sections. In 2002, after many years of local campaigning, the Transport Minister, John Spellar, gave support for the upgrading of the remaining single-carriageway sections by the Highways Agency. The first three projects began construction in early 2006 and opened in 2007 and 2008. The whole route between the A1(M) and M6 was due to be dualled by 2011, by which time the upgrade of the A1 to motorway status at Scotch Corner was planned to be complete.

After the construction of several sections commenced, it was announced that those schemes currently in the planning phase would not go ahead until 2016 at the earliest. The Highways Agency website states "Other than those already committed, the Regions did not identify any other major schemes for the A66 as high priorities to receive funding. This means that there is currently no likelihood of any additional major schemes on this route being funded within the next ten-year period. However the Regional Funding Allocation process will be reviewed in due course and this will give an opportunity for the Regions to revise their priorities."

In September 2015, the government said that £500,000 would be invested into the study of the two Trans-Pennine routes of the A66 and the A69. The proposal would be for one or even both roads to be dualled wholly between the A1/A1(M) and the M6. The following year the government announced that the A66 would be dualled, but not the A69.  In March 2019, project director Matt Townsend from Highways England announced plans for a public consultation from May 2019, in which it would present its plans for a £500 million spend to complete dualling the Trans-Pennine section, together with improvements at the M6 and A1(M) interchanges.

Additionally, a plan to create a second crossing of the River Tees near for traffic on the congested A19 road, would see the widening of the A66 between Teesside Park and the Tees Viaduct interchange.

Safety 
The section of road between Scotch Corner and Penrith accounted for 70 deaths over ten years up until 2002, which was above the national average for single lane carriageways. Whilst the number of accidents was in line with the national average, the number of serious injuries and deaths was twice the national average; this high attrition rate was the reason for the go-ahead for the new dualled sections on the grounds of safety.

Snow gates were installed on the road between Bowes and Brough. Both sets of gates have turnaround facilities to allow all traffic to change direction.

Accidents and incidents 

 2010 A66 Keswick coach accident  on 24 May 2010, three people were killed, four were seriously injured and approximately 30 people sustained less severe injuries after a car collided with a coach carrying children home from Keswick School on the A66 in Cumbria.

Gallery

A66(M) 

The A66(M) is a spur from the A1(M) at Junction 57. It was opened in 1965 along with the A1(M) as part of the Darlington by-pass motorway. It can be accessed only by northbound traffic on the A1(M) and has an exit to this route southbound only.

Junctions  

{| class="plainrowheaders wikitable"
|-
!scope=col|County
!scope=col|Location
!scope=col|mi
!scope=col|km
!scope=col|Junction
!scope=col|Destinations
!scope=col|Notes
|-
|rowspan="2"|North Yorkshire
|rowspan="2"|Darlington
|0
|0
|bgcolor="ffdddd" |—
|bgcolor="ffdddd" |  - The South, Scotch Corner
|bgcolor="ffdddd" |No entrance to A1(M) Northbound, no entrance from A1(M) Southbound
|-
|2.2
|3.5
|—
|  - Darlington, Teesside Airport  Barton
|

Coordinate list

References

External links 

 Heritage and History – Greta Bridge, Keswick
 CBRD Motorway Database – A66(M)
 Pathetic Motorways – A66(M)
 SABRE article on the A66
 The Motorway Archive – A1(M) & A66(M) The Darlington By-Pass motorway
 Road to Nowhere: A66

Motorways in England
Roads in Cumbria
Roads in Yorkshire
Transport in County Durham
Transport in North Yorkshire